Marius Riise is a Norwegian handball player.

He made his debut on the Norwegian national team in 1997, and played 57 matches for the national team between 1997 and 2005. He competed at the 2005 World Men's Handball Championship.

References

Year of birth missing (living people)
Living people
Norwegian male handball players